Aldo Cosentino (born 19 October 1947) is a French boxer. He competed at the 1968 Summer Olympics, 1972 Summer Olympics and the 1976 Summer Olympics.

References

1947 births
Living people
French male boxers
Olympic boxers of France
Boxers at the 1968 Summer Olympics
Boxers at the 1972 Summer Olympics
Boxers at the 1976 Summer Olympics
Pieds-Noirs
Sportspeople from Tunis
AIBA World Boxing Championships medalists
Bantamweight boxers